Woodup Pool in Tollesbury, Essex (also known as Woodrolfe Pool) is a salt-water pond or lake used as an open-air swimming pool or amenity pool.

History
The pool was opened in 1907 by Lady de Crespigny. In 1925 the pool was bought by Tollesbury Parish Council for £250.  In 1934 Alexander Eaton drowned in the pool while on holiday with his fiancée.

Description
This is a free public swimming lake next to Woodrolfe Park flats and Woodrolfe Creek. There are no lifeguards. The amenity pool is managed by the Woodup Pool Committee, Tollesbury Parish Council.

References

External links
Lidos in the UK
Outdoor Swimming Society
Map location

Lidos
1907 establishments in England